Michelle Hurd (born December 21, 1966) is an American actress best known for her work in television. She first received recognition for portraying Monique Jeffries in the police procedural series Law & Order: Special Victims Unit (1999–2001). She has since starred as Athena Barnes in the drama series Leap Years (2001), Colleen Manus in the crime drama series The Glades (2010–2013), Linda Bates Emery in the comedy-horror series Ash vs Evil Dead (2016), and Ellen "Shepherd" Briggs in the crime drama series Blindspot (2015–2018). She portrays Raffi Musiker in the science fiction series Star Trek: Picard (2020–present).

Early life
Michelle Hurd is the daughter of actor Hugh Hurd and Merlyn Hurd, an actress and clinical psychologist. Her parents met when they appeared in the same Broadway show. Hurd has two sisters. She graduated from Saint Ann's School in 1984 and Boston University in 1988, and studied with the Alvin Ailey School. After her graduation from college, she studied at London's National Theatre.

Career
One of Hurd's early Off Broadway performances was in the play The Constant Couple in 1990. A review in The Nation predicted that this would be a stepping stone to Broadway roles. Hurd made her Broadway debut in the 1996 Stephen Sondheim–George Furth play Getting Away with Murder. Her other theatre credits include Othello, A.M.L., Hamlet and The Hunchback of Notre Dame. Hurd acted in Looking for the Pony for Manhattan Theater Source with her sister Adrienne and in 900 Oneonta for Circle Repertory Company with Garret Dillahunt who would become her husband. She won the Robbie Award and the California Theatre Award for Best Supporting Actress in a Drama for the premiere of Richard Greenberg's The Violet Hour.

Michelle Hurd appeared as the comic book superhero B.B. DaCosta / Fire in the failed television pilot Justice League of America in 1997. Her other early television appearances include New York Undercover, The Practice and The Cosby Mysteries. Her experiences filming the latter series led her to come forward as a witness to a woman being drugged by Bill Cosby. Hurd's association with the Law & Order franchise began with her appearance in a 1997 episode of the titular series. Her performance as a corrupt FBI informant caught the attention of Law & Order producer Dick Wolf, who two years later cast her in the spin-off Law & Order: Special Victims Unit as Detective Monique Jeffries. She co-starred with Christopher Meloni and Mariska Hargitay for the first season before leaving the main cast in 2000. She appeared in the first, seventh and sixteenth episodes of season two.

After her time on SVU, Hurd had television roles in Charmed, The O.C., According to Jim, Shark, Bones, and Gossip Girl. She collaborated with her husband again in the 2001 Showtime original series Leap Years. From 2006 to 2007, she had a recurring role on ER as television news producer Courtney Brown, who becomes close to Dr. Kerry Weaver. She also returned to the stage, playing the lead role Diana in the Washington Shakespeare Theatre Company's February 10 – March 29, 2009 production of Lope de Vega's Dog in the Manger.

In 2010, Hurd began a starring role on the A&E Network drama The Glades, playing Colleen Manus. In March 2018, it was announced that Hurd would have a leading role in the CBS reboot of Cagney & Lacey, playing the character Mary Beth Lacey (originated by Tyne Daly in the original series), starring alongside Sarah Drew.

In 2014, she appeared as Constance “Connie” Irving in Season 1 of the very popular streaming series Bosch. She was then replaced by Erika Alexander in Season 2.

In 2016, Hurd had a recurring role in the second season of Daredevil as Samantha Reyes, a corrupt district attorney overseeing the prosecution of Frank Castle. Hurd had debuted the role in the season 1 finale of Jessica Jones.

On April 26, 2018, Michelle Hurd spoke in a panel for World Intellectual Property Day with a theme of celebrating the creative output of women.

In 2019, Hurd took on the role of Raffi Musiker in the Paramount Plus series Star Trek: Picard. The series began streaming on the service in January 2020.

Personal life
In 2007, Hurd married actor Garret Dillahunt.

Filmography

Film

Television

Video games

Radio

Theatre

References

External links
 
 
 

1966 births
Living people
20th-century American actresses
21st-century American actresses
Actresses from New York City
African-American actresses
American film actresses
American stage actresses
American television actresses
Boston University College of Fine Arts alumni
Saint Ann's School (Brooklyn) alumni
20th-century African-American women
20th-century African-American people
21st-century African-American women
21st-century African-American people